Fern Canyon is a canyon in the Prairie Creek Redwoods State Park in Humboldt County, California, western United States. The park is managed in cooperation with other nearby redwoods state parks and Redwood National Park. Fern Canyon is recognized as a World Heritage Site and an International Biosphere Reserve.

History 
Fern Canyon was donated by the Pacific Lumber Company to the State to add  to Prairie Creek State Park.

Ferns
Fern Canyon has California native ferns covering the   sheer walls, giving a primeval habitat quality.
Some species include:
Adiantum aleuticum
Blechnum spicant
Polypodium californicum
Polypodium glycyrrhiza
Polystichum munitum

Access
A hiking trail follows the canyon and creek. The start of Fern Canyon Trail is reached at the bottom of the canyon by hiking a quarter mile north up California Coastal Trail from Fern Canyon Day Use Area, which is north of Gold Bluffs Beach Campground.

Filming location
The prehistoric ambience led to the canyon being used as a filming location for The Lost World: Jurassic Park, BBC's Walking with Dinosaurs and IMAX's Dinosaurs Alive!.

Gallery

References

External links
official Prairie Creek Redwoods State Park website

Redwood National and State Parks
Canyons and gorges of California
Ferns of California
Landforms of Humboldt County, California
Pacific Lumber Company